The Gorgan Plain, or Dasht-e Gorgan, is situated in northeastern Iran in Golestan Province. It extends from the lower slopes of the Alborz and Kopet Dag mountain ranges to the steppes of Turkmenistan. The River Gorgan flows through the plain from east to west, emptying into the Caspian Sea. The southern part is very fertile, being watered by the many streams that flow from the Alborz Mountains.

History
More than fifty Neolithic sites have been identified on the Gorgan Plain. Most are raised on mounds and many have seen more than one period of occupation. The sites are thought to relate to the Jeitun culture of southern Turkmenistan and may date to the sixth millennium BC, judging by the age of the artefacts found at Sang-i Chakmak. Other nearby sites include Yarim Tepe, and Tureng Tepe.

The Great Wall of Gorgan was built between about 420 AD and 530s AD by the Sasanian Empire on the northern edge of the plain between the Caspian Sea and the mountains. The wall and forts along it were built of red mudbrick and fired brick, and to provide the water necessary for the manufacture of the bricks, a system of canals was dug across the plain; one canal paralleled the wall, which had to follow the natural gradient, while others were fed from supplier canals, which bridged the Gorgan River with the help of qanats. A mile to the south of the wall lies Qaleh Kharabeh, a fort that may have housed a garrison serving on the wall. It contains the remains of roadways and rows of mud-brick huts.

References

Plains of Iran
Landforms of Golestan Province